Tseng Tau Tsuen is a village in Tuen Mun District, Hong Kong.

Tseng Tau Tsuen comprises Tseng Tau Chung Tsuen, Tseng Tau Ha Tsuen() and Tseng Tau Sheung Tsuen.

Administration
Administratively, Tseng Tau Tsuen comprises Tseng Tau Tsuen (Middle and Lower) and Tseng Tau Tsuen (Upper), two of the 36 villages represented within the Tuen Mun Rural Committee.

Education
Tseng Tau Tsuen is in Primary One Admission (POA) School Net 71. Within the school net are multiple aided schools (operated independently but funded with government money); no government schools are in the school net.

References

External links

 Delineation of area of existing village Tseng Tau Tsuen (Middle and Lower) (Tuen Mun) for election of resident representative (2019 to 2022)
 Delineation of area of existing village Tseng Tau Tsuen (Upper) (Tuen Mun) for election of resident representative (2019 to 2022)

Villages in Tuen Mun District, Hong Kong